The Battle of Sidon was a battle fought between the Palestine Liberation Organization (PLO) and the Lebanese Government from 2 to 6 July 1991, and was the final battle of the Lebanese Civil War. The causes of the battle laid in the PLO's refusal to accept the Taif Agreement, which required the PLO to disarm. The government's deadline for PLO withdrawal from Sidon was on 1 July 1991. After four days of fighting, the PLO capitulated, marking the end of hostilities in the Lebanese Civil War. The Lebanese Government hoped that defeating the PLO would convince Israel to end its occupation of Southern Lebanon, which the Israeli government justified by its need for a buffer against PLO incursions.

References 

Sidon
1991 in Lebanon
Battles involving Lebanon
Sidon